The Plage aux Ptérosaures (in French, "Beach to Pterosaurs"), located on the Mas de Pégourdy in the commune of Crayssac in the department of Lot, is a palaeoichnologic site bearing tracks made by dinosaurs and pterosaurs.

Description

The site was uncovered in 1993. The Plage aux Ptérosaures was, at the end of the Jurassic era, located in a gulf opened on the Atlantic ocean between Bordeaux and the island of Oléron. It was during that period a marine lagoon. The site itself was a mudflat, flooded at high tide, in which animals were foraging for food.

Jean-Michel Mazin, research director of the CNRS at the Claude Bernard university, oversaw the research. Forty species of ichnotaxa dating back from around 140 million years were identified.

The Plage aux Ptérosaures is protected by a metallic building, in which paleontologists works in near-complete darkness, for only a raking light can expose the ground contours and sometimes reveal new tracks.

References

External links 
 Movie extract from "La plage aux ptérosaures", by Pierre Saunier.
 Plage aux ptérosaures

Pterosaurs
Jurassic France
Fossil trackways
Paleontology in France